The ARCHOS 70 Internet Tablet is part of the Archos Generation 8 range, distributed between 2010-11. It is a 7 inches (18 cm) tablet computer running Android.

See also
 Archos 43
 Archos 101

References

Tablet computers
Tablet computers introduced in 2010
Touchscreen portable media players
Android (operating system) devices